The 2009 Korean FA Cup Final was a football match played on 8 November 2009 at Seongnam Stadium in Seongnam that decided the winner of the 2009 season of the Korean FA Cup. The 2009 final was the culmination of the 14th season of the tournament.

The final was contested by Seongnam Ilhwa Chunma and Suwon Samsung Bluewings. The match kicked off at 14:00 KST. The referee for the match was Choi Kwang-Bo.

Road to the final

Seongnam Ilhwa Chunma

1Seongnam's goals always recorded first.

Suwon Samsung Bluewings

1Suwon's goals always recorded first.

Match details

See also
2009 Korean FA Cup

References

External links

2009
FA
Korean FA Cup Final 2009
Korean FA Cup Final 2009
Korean FA Cup Final 2009